Mary of Lusignan (French: Marie de Lusignan; before March 1215 – 5 July 1251 or 1253), was the wife of Count Walter IV of Brienne and Countess of Brienne from the time of her marriage in 1233 to her husband's death while on Crusade in 1244. Mary's parents were King Hugh I of Cyprus and Alice of Champagne, making her a maternal granddaughter of Queen Isabella I of Jerusalem. Her two surviving sons were John, Count of Brienne, and Hugh of Brienne.

Family and betrothal
Mary was born sometime before March 1215, the eldest daughter and child of King Hugh I of Cyprus and Alice of Champagne, the daughter of Queen Isabella I of Jerusalem and Henry II, Count of Champagne. She had a younger sister, Isabelle, and a brother, Henry, who succeeded as king upon the death of their father in January 1218. In 1225, Alice married secondly Bohemond V of Antioch, after she and her sister, Philippa had long become embroiled in a bitter dispute with Blanche of Navarre over the county of Champagne, which was later known as the Champagne War of Succession.

Before 21 July 1229, Mary was betrothed to Peter I, Duke of Brittany, whose wife Alix of Thouars had died in 1221; however, the Pope prohibited the match due to their fourth degree consanguinity.

Marriage and issue
By 1233, Mary married Walter IV, Count of Brienne. The marriage had been arranged by his uncle John of Brienne. From the time of her marriage, she was styled Countess of Brienne. Her husband was also the Count of Jaffa and Ascolom, the title of which had been granted to him by his father, Walter III of Brienne in 1221.

Together Mary and Walter had:
 John, Count of Brienne (c.1235- 1260/61), married Mary of Enghien; died childless.
 Hugh of Brienne, Count of Brienne and Lecce  (c.1240- 9 August 1296), married firstly Isabelle de la Roche, Heiress of Thebes, daughter of Guy I de la Roche, and by whom he had issue; married secondly Helena Komnenos Dukaina, by whom he had one daughter, Joanna of Brienne.
 Amaury of Brienne

Mary became a widow in October 1244 after Walter was murdered in Cairo. He had been taken prisoner following the Crusader-Syrian defeat at the Battle of La Forbie where he had led the Crusader Army against the Egyptian forces. Their eldest son, John succeeded him as Count of Brienne. Mary remained at the Cypriot court and died on 5 July in 1251 or 1253. 

In 1267, after the death of King Hugh II, Mary's only surviving son Hugh claimed the Cypriot kingdom for himself, but was passed over by the Haute Cour of Jerusalem in favour of her younger sister Isabella's son, Hugh of Antioch.

References

Sources

Women of the Crusader states
House of Lusignan
People of the Kingdom of Cyprus
1210s births
1250s deaths
House of Brienne
Daughters of kings